WR 3 is a Wolf-Rayet star located around 9,500 light years away from Earth in the constellation of Cassiopeia.

WR 3 is a member of the nitrogen sequence of WR stars and has a spectrum with strong HeII and NV lines, but weak NIV. HeI lines are very weak or missing, but there are lines of OVI. Unusually, there are lines of hydrogen and absorption components in many lines creating P Cygni profiles. Overall, the emission is weaker than stars of similar spectral type, and it has often been suggested that WR 3 has a type O binary companion. However, there are no other signs of a companion and it is thought to be a single star with a spectral type of WN3-hw. The "h" and "w" indicate that hydrogen is present and the emission is weaker for the class.

Ordered by right ascension, WR 3 was the third star in the Sixth Catalogue of galactic Wolf-Rayet stars. WR 1 and WR 2 are also both early WN stars in Cassiopeiae.

WR 3 is a massive and luminous star. The presence of hydrogen in its spectrum suggests that it is younger than hydrogen-free WR stars and may still be in the process of ejecting the remainder of its hydrogen. The emission lines of heavy elements in its spectrum are produced by strong convection and powerful stellar winds rather than complete loss of the outer layers of the star.

References

Cassiopeia (constellation)
Wolf–Rayet stars
009974
007681
J01385562+5809227